Grégory Dufrennes (born 15 March 1983) is a French former professional footballer, who played as an attacking midfielder, and the manager of Dibba Al Fujairah

Career
Dufrennes played in Ligue 2 with Amiens SC and FC Sète 34.

Personal life
Dufrennes's father, Jean-Luc, is a retired professional footballer who played in Ligue 2 with Entente Viry-Châtillon. His brother, Franck, is an amateur footballer who played for Vannes OC.

References

External links
 
 

1979 births
Living people
People from Les Ulis
Footballers from Essonne
French footballers
Association football midfielders
Amiens SC players
FC Sète 34 players
Al Ahli Club (Dubai) players
Dubai CSC players
Al-Ittihad Kalba SC players
Khor Fakkan Sports Club players
UAE Pro League players
UAE First Division League players
Al Wahda FC managers
UAE Pro League managers
French expatriate footballers
French expatriate sportspeople in the United Arab Emirates
Expatriate footballers in the United Arab Emirates
Expatriate football managers in the United Arab Emirates